The current ambassador is Rishi Ram Ghimire.

The Nepali ambassador in Moscow is the official representative of the Government in Kathmandu to the Government of the Russia.

List of representatives

References 

 
Nepal
Russia